Tyrone Thompson (born 28 May 2000) is a New Zealand rugby union player, who currently plays as a hooker for  in New Zealand's domestic National Provincial Championship competition and the  in Super Rugby.

Early life and career

Tyrone Thompson hails from Muriwai, in the Gisborne District in the northeastern corner of New Zealand's North Island. At the age of 5, he moved with his family to Napier in Hawke's Bay.

Tyrone and his twin brother Leo attended Napier Boys' High School, where they played first XV rugby together. Eight days later, they played in the National Top 4 Final, which Napier Boys' narrowly lost 28 - 31 to St Peter's College, Auckland. Thompson scored a try in that final.

Thompson attended a Hurricanes Under 17 Development Camp in 2017 and a Hurricanes U18 Camp, a year later.

After finishing high school, Thompson and his brother signed a contract with the Wellington Rugby Academy and moved to Wellington. There, he plays club rugby for Marist St Pats, the club his father, uncle and cousins have also played for.

Both Thompson brothers represented Wellington at the Jock Hobbs Memorial National Under 19 Tournament in 2019, finishing the tournament in third place.

Senior career

On 28 August 2020, Thompson was named in the  squad for the 2020 Mitre 10 Cup. He made his debut for the Lions - off the bench - against  on 12 September 2020. He earned his first start and scored a brilliant 50m try - his first in the National Provincial Championship - on 25 September 2020 against .

Since his arrival in Wellington, Thompson has played several games for the Hurricanes U20 team and the Hurricanes Hunters (Development) squad.

On 22 November 2021, Thompson was named in the  squad for the 2022 Super Rugby Pacific season. He made his debut for the franchise (from the reserves bench) on 19 March 2022 against  and scored a try on debut.

Also on 19 March 2022, the Hawke's Bay Rugby Union announced that Thompson had signed with the Union and would be joining the  Magpies for the next two National Provincial Championship seasons. He made his debut for the province – via the bench – on 6 August 2022 against  and scored his first try for the Magpies on 12 August 2022 in a successful Ranfurly Shield defence against .

International career

In 2018, after his last year at Napier Boys' High School, Thompson was named in the New Zealand Secondary Schools team for a three-match international series in Australia. He played in all three games, including a 24 - 12 victory over Australian Schools.

A year later, both Thompson and his twin brother Leo - who are of Ngāi Tāmanuhiri and Ngāti Rangiwewehi descent - were selected to play for the first ever New Zealand Māori Under 20 team in a match against . The NZ Māori Under 20 team won the game 48 to 31.

Late 2019 and early 2020, Thompson was invited to attend the New Zealand Under 20 trial and development camps in preparation of the 2020 Oceania Rugby Under 20 Championship and World Rugby U20 Championship. Unfortunately, Thompson missed out on playing for the New Zealand Under 20 team, because these tournaments were cancelled due to the COVID-19 pandemic.

In June 2022, Thompson was – for the first time – named in the Māori All Blacks squad to take on Ireland on their New Zealand tour.  He made his debut for the side on 29 June 2022, when the Māori All Blacks beat Ireland 32–17 in Hamilton.

He made his debut for the side – via the bench – on 4 November 2022 against Ireland A. The All Blacks XV won the game 47–19.

References

External links
itsrugby.co.uk profile

2000 births
Living people
People educated at Napier Boys' High School
Ngāi Tāmanuhiri people
Ngāti Rangiwewehi people
New Zealand rugby union players
New Zealand Māori rugby union players
Rugby union players from the Gisborne Region
Rugby union hookers
Wellington rugby union players
Chiefs (rugby union) players
Hawke's Bay rugby union players
Māori All Blacks players